Ray Wilborn (born April 1, 1997) is an American football linebacker for the Denver Broncos of the National Football League (NFL). He has also been a member of the Pittsburgh Steelers and Green Bay Packers.

Early life and education
Wilborn was born on April 1, 1997, in Lansing, Michigan. He attended J. W. Sexton High School where he earned four varsity letters in football and was twice named first-team all-state. Wilborn was a two-time captain and as a junior set the school record for single-season sacks with 18. He also played on offense, and as a senior caught 14 touchdown passes and recorded 970 receiving yards.

Wilborn began his college football career at Garden City Community College in 2016, helping them win the national championship. In two seasons with Garden City, he posted 120 tackles, 8.5 sacks and 23  while appearing in 23 games.

In 2018, Wilborn transferred to Ball State. Joining the school in January, he started all 12 games for the football team as an outside linebacker, leading them in both TFLs (10.5) and tackles (83). He made his first career interception against Notre Dame and later made one against NIU, the latter of which he returned for 43 yards.

As a senior in 2019, Wilborn changed from linebacker to safety after the team needed a player at the position. That season, he started all 12 games and posted 83 tackles, placing third on the team. He also made two interceptions, against NC State and Eastern Michigan, and tied for fourth on Ball State with six pass breakups.

Professional career

Atlanta Falcons
Although projected by some as a seventh round pick in the 2020 NFL Draft, Wilborn ultimately went unselected, and afterwards was signed by the Atlanta Falcons as an undrafted free agent. He was waived at the final roster cuts, on September 5.

Pittsburgh Steelers
On October 23, 2020, he was signed to the practice squad of the Pittsburgh Steelers, only to be released on November 17.

Green Bay Packers
In January 2021, Wilborn was signed by the Green Bay Packers to a future contract. He was placed on the reserve/COVID-19 list on July 24, and was then activated on August 4. Wilborn was released at the end of August, during the final roster cuts, and was afterwards brought back as a member of the practice squad. He was placed on the COVID-19 list for a second time on December 31, later receiving activation on January 5, 2022. Wilborn was signed to a future contract again on January 25, 2022, after spending the entire 2021 season on the practice squad. He was released by the Packers in August 2022, at the final roster cuts.

Denver Broncos
Wilborn received a tryout from the Denver Broncos in November 2022, and was afterwards signed to their practice squad. He was elevated to the active roster for the Broncos' Week 17 game with the Kansas City Chiefs, and made his NFL debut in the loss, appearing on 14 special teams snaps. He signed a reserve/future contract on January 9, 2023.

References

1997 births
Living people
American football safeties
American football linebackers
Sportspeople from Lansing, Michigan
Garden City Broncbusters football players
Ball State Cardinals football players
Atlanta Falcons players
Pittsburgh Steelers players
Green Bay Packers players
Denver Broncos players